Pseudoephedrine/loratadine (trade names Claritin-D, Clarinase, Clarinase Repetabs, Lorinase, Rhinos SR, Allerclear-D) is an orally administered combination drug used for the treatment of allergic rhinitis and the common cold. This drug can be bought "over the counter" in some countries (United States, Hong Kong), but it is restricted to prescription in others (Czech Republic, Israel).

 Pseudoephedrine, one of the naturally occurring alkaloids of ephedra, is a sympathomimetic used as a decongestant. It produces a decongestant effect that is facilitated by the vasoconstriction in the mucosal capillaries of the upper respiratory areas.
 Loratadine is a long-acting antihistamine (H1 histamine antagonist) that is less sedating than older substances of its type.

Medical uses

Pseudoephedrine/loratadine are indicated for the relief of symptoms associated with allergic rhinitis and the common cold including nasal congestion, sneezing, rhinorrhea, pruritus and lacrimation.

Composition

Clarinase Repetabs
A Clarinase Repetab tablet contains 5 mg loratadine in the tablet coating and 120 mg pseudoephedrine sulfate equally distributed between the tablet coating and the barrier-coated core. The two active components in the coating are quickly liberated; release of pseudoephedrine in the core is delayed for several hours.

Interactions, adverse effects and contraindications
Interactions, adverse effects and contraindications are described in more detail in the articles about pseudoephedrine and loratadine.

Interactions
When sympathomimetics are given to patients receiving monoamine oxidase inhibitors (MAO inhibitors), hypertensive reactions, including hypertensive crises may occur.

Adverse effects
During controlled clinical studies with the recommended dosage, the incidence of adverse effects was comparable to that of placebo, with the exception of insomnia and dry mouth, both of which were commonly reported.

Contraindications
Clarinase is contraindicated in patients receiving MAO inhibitor therapy or within 14 days of discontinuing such treatment and in patients with narrow angle glaucoma, urinary retention, severe hypertension, severe coronary artery disease and hyperthyroidism.

References
 Drugs.com: Claritin-D
 Israel Ministry of Health: Clarinase Repetabs
 

H1 receptor antagonists
Decongestants
Combination drugs